This article documents the 1989–90 season of football club Derby County F.C.

League table

Results

First Division

FA Cup

League Cup

Full Members' Cup

Squad

References 

Derby County F.C. seasons
Derby County F.C.